Guadalupe (Vallegrande) is a small town in Santa Cruz, Bolivia.

References

Populated places in Santa Cruz Department (Bolivia)